Janibacter alkaliphilus is a bacterium from the genus Janibacter which has been isolated from the coral Anthogorgia from China.

References

 

Intrasporangiaceae
Bacteria described in 2012